Guardian Cherubs is a 2-dimensional puzzle video game developed by Finnish studio Markan Saha, and was released for the iPhone and the iPad in 2012. It is no longer available on the iOS App Store.

References

IOS games
2012 video games
IOS-only games
Puzzle video games
Video games about angels
Video games developed in Finland